Novosyolka is a rural locality (a village) in located in the Sergeikhinskoye Rural Settlement, Kameshkovsky District, Vladimir Oblast, Russia. The population was 13 as of 2010.

Geography 
Novosyolka is located on the Pechuga River, 21 km northwest of Kameshkovo (the district's administrative centre) by road. Novaya Zarya is the nearest rural locality.

References 

Rural localities in Kameshkovsky District